"Every Little Thing" is a song by the English rock band the Beatles from their album Beatles for Sale, issued in the UK in December 1964. Credited to Lennon–McCartney, it was written by Paul McCartney. Capitol Records first issued the song in the US on Beatles VI in June 1965. The track is an early example of the Beatles' use of non-rock instrumentation on a recording, through the addition of timpani drum over the choruses.

Composition
Recalling the song's creation in his authorised biography, Many Years from Now (1997), McCartney says he wrote "Every Little Thing" in the music room at the London home of his then-girlfriend Jane Asher, where he was living at the time. Other sources, citing a 1964 interview with McCartney, place the song's origins at Atlantic City in the United States, where the Beatles stopped over in late August that same year during their US tour. In 1980, John Lennon told Playboy magazine that McCartney wrote the song, although he himself might have "[thrown] something in". Author John Winn concludes that McCartney began the composition in London and finished it with Lennon in Atlantic City.

"Every Little Thing" is a rare example of a Lennon–McCartney song in which one member of the partnership was primary composer (here McCartney) but the other sang lead vocal (here Lennon). McCartney sings in unison with Lennon on the verses, but Lennon's vocal is more prominent. McCartney sings the high harmony on the chorus.

Recording
The Beatles recorded "Every Little Thing" for their fourth studio album, Beatles for Sale, during a period when Lennon and McCartney's productivity as songwriters had suffered as a result of the band's international touring commitments. In Many Years from Now, McCartney says he had intended the song to be their next single, but it "didn't have quite what was required", and was issued as an album track instead.

The group recorded the song in four takes at EMI Studios in London on 29 September 1964, and then five more on 30 September. The recording has been the source of some confusion among commentators, based on McCartney's comments in 1964 that the electric guitar riff was played by Lennon, rather than by George Harrison, the band's lead guitarist. In their respective line-ups for the song, authors Ian MacDonald and Kenneth Womack each credit Harrison for the lead guitar part, played on a Rickenbacker 12-string, and Lennon as the acoustic rhythm guitarist. Winn also names Harrison as the lead guitarist, saying that he played Rickenbacker on the basic track and the subsequent overdubs.

The four band members enjoyed themselves on the second night; take 6 was aborted due to McCartney burping his vocals, and take 7 was finished but ended in loud laughter. "Every Little Thing" is one of the first Beatles tracks to include "exotic" instrumentation, as Ringo Starr added timpani over the choruses, punctuating the refrain with one-two flourishes. In addition, musicologist Walter Everett highlights the subtle use of piano in the musical arrangement; played as an electric guitar motif by Harrison on initial takes of the song, the piano part provides a countermelody during the verses. The timpani and piano (the latter played by McCartney) were overdubbed onto take 9, along with a guitar intro.

Critical reception
Ian MacDonald praised the "emotional depth" of "Every Little Thing" and cited this song among others as a counter-argument to the common perception of McCartney as an "emotional lightweight". Richie Unterberger of AllMusic also admires the song and its "infectious chorus". While considering the Lennon–McCartney compositions on Beatles for Sale to be relatively uninspired, author Mark Hertsgaard pairs "Every Little Thing" with "I Don't Want to Spoil the Party" as tracks that demonstrate "how the band, thanks largely to John and Paul's extraordinary singing, could make unremarkable material sound richer than it really was". Tom Ewing of Pitchfork Media describes "Every Little Thing" as a "splendid" song that is "given melodramatic thrust by Shangri-Las-style piano and bass drum". While noting the Beatles' fatigue on the album in reaction to their punishing schedule in 1964, Ewing views McCartney's narrative as "distinctly melancholy, his 'yes, I know I'm a lucky guy' sounding like an attempt to convince himself of that".

In 2010, "Every Little Thing" appeared at number 91 on Rolling Stone magazine's list of the "100 Greatest Beatles Songs".

This song was revisited briefly during the stressful rehearsals that were recorded for the Beatles' Get Back/Let It Be project – Harrison describes it as "a good one" before starting to play the lick, McCartney joining in on vocals.

Guesting on NPR's All Songs Considered, musician Matthew Caws selected "Every Little Thing" as his pick for "perfect song". Caws said: "the lyrics are happy and simple, but the melody is sad and deceptively complex. The disconnect between these two elements is what gives the song such depth."

Personnel
According to Ian MacDonald and Kenneth Womack:

John Lennon – double-tracked lead vocal, acoustic guitar
Paul McCartney – vocal harmony, bass, piano
George Harrison – double-tracked lead guitar
Ringo Starr – drums, timpani

Cover versions
 In 1969, Yes covered this song on their self-titled debut album. Their cover turned the song into a grungy wall of sound with several tempo and key changes and an extended jam opening that also references the Beatles' "Day Tripper".
 In 1986, Lou Ann Barton did a version on her EP Forbidden Tones.
 In 2003, Peter Lipa included this song and 15 other Lennon–McCartney songs on his album Beatles in Blue(s).
 In 2004, Martin Gordon released a cover on The Joy of More Hogwash.
 In 2006, Barbara Dickson included this song and eleven other Lennon–McCartney and Harrison songs on her album Nothing's Gonna Change My World.

References

Sources

 
 
 
 
 
 
 
 
 

The Beatles songs
1964 songs
Song recordings produced by George Martin
Yes (band) songs
Songs written by Lennon–McCartney
Songs published by Northern Songs